Silas Merritt Robertson (born April 27, 1948), known as Si Robertson and often referred to as "Uncle Si", is an American television personality, veteran, and a retired reed maker for duck calls at Duck Commander. He is best known for his role on A&E's Duck Dynasty, on which he has emerged as a breakout cast member. He has also appeared on other shows such as the Outdoor Channel's Buck Commander and The Duckmen of Louisiana, and was the eponymous host of the Duck Dynasty spin-off Going Si-Ral. Si has also made a guest appearance on Last Man Standing, and in Big Idea Entertainment's Veggie Tales episode Merry Larry and the True Light of Christmas as Silas the Narrator.

Early life
Robertson was born to James and Merritt (née Hale) Robertson in Vivian, Louisiana, the sixth of seven children. He has four brothers, Jimmy Frank, Harold, Tommy, and Phil (who was born 2 years before him), and two sisters, Judy and Jan. Because of financial setbacks of their family during Si and his siblings' childhoods, the Robertson family lived in rugged conditions with significantly fewer amenities than the average American enjoyed. In high school, Si attended North Caddo High School in Vivian, Louisiana which is in Caddo Parish, Louisiana. He played on the football team in the footsteps of his brother Phil, even wearing the same #10 jersey.

Military career
After dropping out of Louisiana Tech University in Ruston, Louisiana after three quarters, he was drafted into the United States Army during the Vietnam War. During the war, his mother sent him a set of Tupperware cups, beans and rice, two boots, and two jars of jalapeño peppers in each boot. He is rarely seen without one of his plastic cups drinking iced tea, which he treats with equal importance.

Si retired from the Army in 1993 with the rank of Sergeant First Class (E-7). Robertson is recognized for his military career with an exhibit at the Chennault Aviation and Military Museum in Monroe, Louisiana.

Business with Duck Commander
Upon retirement from the Army in 1993, Si found employment at his brother Phil's Duck Commander business. Si has been a big part of the growing business. His job is to fashion the reeds that are inserted in every patented duck call. Si thinks that it is a pretty easy job and is depicted in Duck Dynasty as having difficulties staying on task; he often seeks breaks to take a nap or play around with equipment in the warehouse.

Personal life
In an interview with  Good Morning America, Robertson described his wife, "One woman has already got my heart, we've been married for 43 years (at that time) and her name is Miss Christine Robertson". He discussed how after he had asked for her hand in marriage about 70 times, she finally accepted his proposal. The two married in 1971, and they have a daughter, Trasa, and a son, Scott. They also have eight grandsons.

Like the rest of his family, Robertson is very open about his Christian faith. "That's what got me through 65 years of life, my belief in God and what He's done for us and what He will do for us". His favorite Scripture verses are John 3:16 and 17. "When I sign people's stuff I put down John 3:16 and 17. Most people can tell you what 16 says, OK. 'For God so loved the world that He gave His only begotten son.' But they don't know nothin' about 17. It says Jesus didn't come to condemn us. If anybody had a right to condemn someone, it would be the son of God. If he didn't do it, then hey, we definitely are not qualified to do it."

Robertson lent his voice and personal appearance to the VeggieTales video Merry Larry and the True Light of Christmas, in which he narrates the video and appears as a mall janitor, in the tradition of the mid 1960s and early 1970s Rankin/Bass Christmas specials and their use of celebrity narrators.

Along with his nephew and Duck Dynasty co-star Willie, he appeared on an episode of Last Man Standing. He also appeared as a gas station clerk in the 2015 Christian drama film Faith of Our Fathers.

Robertson's son Scott served in the U.S. Army and completed eight tours in Iraq, after which he was diagnosed with post-traumatic stress disorder, motivating Robertson to advocate for better care for veterans.

Robertson's net worth is more than $8 million.

Duck Dynasty
In A&E's reality television show Duck Dynasty, Si (or Uncle Si) is one of the main characters. He is perhaps the most well-known and recognized character of the bunch, due to the frequency and quality of his jokes and stories, as well as his general manner. His spontaneous nature often launches the plot of the show into action, whether handcuffing himself to his nephew Willie or spending the prize money of $2,000 at a children's arcade.

Robertson also starred in Going Si-Ral, a spinoff which ran from November 16, 2016, to January 18, 2017, on A&E. He and "Si-kick" Willie study the Internet, especially viral videos.

Discography

Works 
 Si-cology 1: Tales and Wisdom from Duck Dynasty's Favorite Uncle. (2013) Simon & Schuster.

References

External links
 Go Behind the Scenes of 'Duck Dynasty' With Uncle Si

1948 births
American autobiographers
American members of the Churches of Christ
United States Army personnel of the Vietnam War
Living people
Louisiana Independents
Louisiana Tech University alumni
North Caddo High School alumni
Participants in American reality television series
People from Caddo Parish, Louisiana
People from West Monroe, Louisiana
Robertson family
United States Army soldiers
Christians from Louisiana
Critics of atheism